Sufian Sultan (born 7 February 1948 in Hebron) is an agricultural engineer and a Palestinian lecturer who holds a PhD in Agricultural Engineering. He served as Minister of Agriculture in the 17th Palestinian Government from 31 July 2015 until 13 April 2019.

References 

Living people
Government ministers of the State of Palestine
People from Hebron
1948 births
Palestinian agronomists
Academic staff of An-Najah National University
University of California, Davis faculty
Ain Shams University alumni
Academic staff of Hebron University